Mi Yuting (born 8 January 1996) is a Chinese professional go player. As of Oct 2018, he is ranking 1st in Go ratings with an Elo rating of 3645.

Promotion record

Titles and runners-up

Head-to-head record vs selected players
 

Players who have won international go titles in bold.

 Lian Xiao 6:12
 Zhou Ruiyang 10:6
 Tang Weixing 10:4
 Shi Yue 9:5
 Chen Yaoye 8:4
 Choi Cheolhan 7:5
 Tuo Jiaxi 5:7
 Gu Zihao 8:3
 Fan Yunruo 7:4
 Jiang Weijie 7:4
 Tong Mengcheng 9:1
 Wang Xi 7:3
 Yang Dingxin 6:4
 Park Junghwan 4:6
 Gu Li 6:3
 Li Qincheng 5:4
 Liao Xingwen 7:1
 Huang Yunsong 4:4
 Xie He 7:1
 Peng Liyao 5:3
 Zhou Hexi 5:3
 Mao Ruilong 4:4
 Qiu Jun 4:3
 Ke Jie 1:6

References

1996 births
Living people
Chinese Go players